The following is a list of Playboy Playmates of 2003.  Playboy magazine names their Playmate of the Month each month throughout the year.

January

Rebecca Anne Ramos (born August 26, 1967) is an American model and actress. She has appeared in a few Playboy videos and is Playboys Playmate of the Month for January 2003. She was the oldest woman to ever become a playmate. She was also Playboy's Cyber Girl of the Week for September 3–9, 2001.

Ramos is the granddaughter of Congressman Henry B. Gonzalez. She now works as a licensed practicing attorney in San Antonio, Texas

February

Charis Boyle (born August 31, 1976, in Alexandria, Virginia) is an American glamour model. She became Playboy's Playmate of the Month for February 2003 after having been a Playboy Cyber Girl in August 2001.  Her centerfold was photographed by Stephen Wayda.

March

Pennelope Jimenez (born July 26, 1978, in San Diego, California) is an American model and actress. She is Playboy's Playmate of the Month of March 2003 and has appeared in Playboy videos. She is of Mexican heritage.

April

Carmella DeCesare  (born July 1, 1982) is an American model who is Playboy magazine's Miss April 2003 and Playmate of the Year for 2004. She performed in WWE's 2004 Diva Search.

Decesare married NFL quarterback Jeff Garcia in 2007. The couple has four children.

May

Laurie Fetter (born Laurie Jo Fetter on January 9, 1982, in Chicago, Illinois) is an American model and actress. She is Playboy's Playmate of the Month for May 2003.

June

Tailor James (born July 21, 1980, in Mississauga, Ontario) is a Canadian model. Prior to her Playboy Playmate of the Month appearance in the June 2003 issue, she was Cyber Girl of the Week in September 2001, and Cyber Girl of the Month in January 2002.

July

Markéta Jánská (born 24 May 1981, in Most, Czechoslovakia) is a Czech model. She was  Playboy magazine's Playmate of the Month for July 2003. Janska started modeling as a teenager and has aspirations of becoming a singer. After leaving home to travel Europe, she then came to the United States on a work permit hoping to become an American citizen.

Since her Playmate pictorial, she has appeared on a variety of television series such as CBS's CSI: Miami (2003) and Swingtown (2008), The Sharon Osbourne Show (2006), HBO's True Blood (2009) and 90210 as well as the 2010 comedy film Couples Retreat.

In 2015, after a trip to Tanzania, it was reported that Janska launched an online fundraising campaign via GoFundMe called "Desks for Kids". The purpose of the campaign is to purchase new desks and supplies for students she met while traveling.

August

Colleen Marie (born Colleen Marie Dwyer on August 28, 1977, in Oklahoma City, Oklahoma) is an American model. She is Playboy magazine's Playmate of the Month for August 2003.  Her centerfold was photographed by Arny Freytag.

September

Luci Victoria (born Luci Victoria Oldfield 2 February 1982 at Sheffield, England) is a British model. She is the Playboy Playmate of the Month in the US version of the magazine for September 2003.  Her centerfold was photographed by Stephen Wayda.

October

Audra Lynn (born Audra Lynn Christiansen January 31, 1980) is an American model and actress. She is Playboy magazine's  Playmate of the Month for October 2003. Lynn was also photographed by Sum 41 for the celebrity photographer section of Playboy.com.  Her Playmate centerfold was photographed by Stephen Wayda and Arny Freytag.

November

Divini Rae (born July 31, 1977, in Alaska), aka Divini Rae Sorenson, is a motivational speaker, fitness personality and entrepreneur. She lives between Tanana, Alaska, and Oklahoma City, Oklahoma. She is Playboy magazine's Playmate of the Month for November, 2003.

December

Deisy and Sarah Teles (born 16 May 1983 in Muçum, Brazil) are the Playboy'' Playmates of the Month for December 2003. They were the fourth identical twins to appear as playmates. The siblings first posed nude in a cover pictorial for the Brazilian Playboy in March 2003, after being chosen among 30,000 couples of twin sisters.

See also
List of people in Playboy 2000–2009

References

2003-related lists
2003
Playmates Of 2003